John Emory Cookman (September 2, 1909 – August 19, 1982) was an American ice hockey player who competed in the 1932 Winter Olympics, playing five matches and scoring two goals.  The American ice hockey team won the silver medal that year.  He graduated from Yale in 1931, and later became the CFO of Philip Morris USA.

He was born in Englewood, New Jersey and died in Plattsburgh, New York.

References

External links
 

1909 births
1982 deaths
American men's ice hockey forwards
Ice hockey players from New Jersey
Ice hockey players at the 1932 Winter Olympics
Medalists at the 1932 Winter Olympics
Olympic silver medalists for the United States in ice hockey
People from Englewood, New Jersey
Sportspeople from Bergen County, New Jersey